Ali Mohamud Mohamed is a Kenyan politician. He was part of the Orange Democratic Movement and was elected to represent the Moyale Constituency in the National Assembly of Kenya since the 2007 Kenyan parliamentary election. He was elected as the second governor of Marsabit county in the 2017 general elections, on the Jubilee ticket.

References

Living people
Year of birth missing (living people)
Orange Democratic Movement politicians
Members of the National Assembly (Kenya)